Events in the year 1963 in Israel.

Incumbents
 Prime Minister of Israel – David Ben-Gurion (Mapai) until 26 June, Levi Eshkol (Mapai)
 President of Israel – Yitzhak Ben-Zvi until 23 April, (Kadish Luz, acting president 23 April to 21 May), Zalman Shazar from 21 May
 President of the Supreme Court – Yitzhak Olshan
 Chief of General Staff – Tzvi Tzur
 Government of Israel – 10th Government of Israel until 26 June, 11th Government of Israel

Events

 23 April – President Yitzhak Ben-Zvi dies in office and Kadish Luz, Speaker of the Knesset, becomes acting President pending the election of a new President.
 21 May – In the 1963 Presidential Election, the Knesset elects Zalman Shazar as President of Israel, by a majority of 67 to 33 votes caste in favour of his opponent, Peretz Bernstein. Shazar assumes office immediately as the third president of the State of Israel.
 16 June – David Ben-Gurion resigns as Prime Minister for what he describes as personal reasons and chooses Levi Eshkol as his successor.
 26 June – Levi Eshkol is elected Prime Minister of Israel. The 11th Government is approved that day and the members are sworn in.
 5 July – Diplomatic relations between the Israeli and the Japanese governments are raised to embassy level.

Israeli–Palestinian conflict 
The most prominent events related to the Israeli–Palestinian conflict which occurred during 1963 include:

Notable Palestinian militant operations against Israeli targets

The most prominent Palestinian fedayeen terror attacks committed against Israelis during 1963 include:

Notable Israeli military operations against Palestinian militancy targets

The most prominent Israeli military counter-terrorism operations (military campaigns and military operations) carried out against Palestinian militants during 1963 include:

Unknown dates
 The re-establishment of the moshav Avivim.
 The founding of the kibbutz Grofit.

Births
 12 January – Rami Heuberger, Israeli actor and entertainer.
 25 August – Avi Ran, Israeli footballer (goalkeeper) (died 1987).
 18 September – Uri Fink, Israeli comic book artist and writer.
 4 October – Ronny Rosenthal, former Israeli footballer.
 4 November – Lior Birkan, swimming champion (died 2020).
 5 November – Yair Lapid, Israeli journalist, author, TV presenter and news anchor.
 20 December – Tal Friedman, Israeli comedian, actor and musician.

Notable deaths

 13 February – Daniel Auster (born 1893), Austro-Hungarian (Galicia)-born Israeli politician, the first Jewish Mayor of Jerusalem.
 23 April – Yitzhak Ben-Zvi (born 1884), Russian (Ukraine)-born Labor Zionist leader and the second President of Israel.
 17 May – Ami Assaf (born 1903), Israeli politician.
 8 June – Haim Boger (born 1876), Russian (Crimea)-born Zionist activist and Israeli politician.
 23 July – Shlomo Lavi (born 1882), Russian (Poland)-born Zionist activist and Israeli politician.
 9 October – Yehezkel Kaufmann (born 1889), Russian (Ukraine)-born Israeli philosopher and Biblical scholar.

Major public holidays

See also
 1963 in Israeli film
 1963 in Israeli music
 1963 in Israeli sport

External links